Anthony "Anton" Hegarty (14 December 1892 – 10 August 1944) was an Irish cross country athlete. He twice represented Ireland at the International Cross Country Championships.

Hegarty was born on 14 December 1892, in Derry, Ireland, the son of Isabel (Isabella) and John Hegarty. He competed for Great Britain at the 1920 Summer Olympics held in Antwerp, Belgium, in the Cross Country Team where he won the silver medal with his teammates James Wilson and Alfred Nichols after finishing fifth in the individual cross country event. He died in Rugby, England in 1944.

References

External links
Profile at www.sports-reference.com
Profile at www.databaseolympics.com

1892 births
1944 deaths
Sportspeople from Derry (city)
Male long-distance runners from Northern Ireland
Olympic athletes of Great Britain
Olympic silver medallists for Great Britain
Athletes (track and field) at the 1920 Summer Olympics
Medalists at the 1920 Summer Olympics
Olympic silver medalists in athletics (track and field)
Olympic cross country runners
Road incident deaths in England